Salbia extensalis is a moth in the family Crambidae. It was described by Paul Dognin in 1911. It is found in Colombia.

References

Spilomelinae
Moths described in 1911